Watts's spiny rat (Maxomys wattsi) is a species of rodent in the family Muridae.

It is endemic to Sulawesi, Indonesia.

References

Maxomys
Mammals described in 1991
Taxonomy articles created by Polbot
Rodents of Sulawesi
Endemic fauna of Indonesia